The Hoodlum may refer to:

The Hoodlum (1919 film), a comedy starring Mary Pickford
The Hoodlum (1951 film), a crime film featuring Lawrence Tierney

See also
Hoodlum (film), a 1997 crime film starring Laurence Fishburne, Tim Roth and Vanessa Williams